Vladimir Ivanovich Ageev (born April 2, 1932, in Man Yalchik village, Yalchiksky District, Chuvashia) is a Soviet Chuvash painter. He is a Chuvash people artist, a Merited Artist of Chuvash Republic, a member of the USSR painters Union (1970), and a winner of the Chuvash State Konstantin Ivanov's prize.

Biography
Ageev was born on April 2, 1932, in the village of Man Yalchiki of the Yalchiksky District in Chuvashia, USSR.

During 1948–1956, he studied in Cheboksary Art School.

Works
"Елчĕкри пасар" Базар в Яльчиках/Market in Yalchiki  (1985)
"Касу" Стадо/ The flok (1985)
"Пăрттă Кĕçтентинĕ вăйă картинче, 1912 ç." К. В. Иванов на празднике хоровода/ Konstantin Ivanov in chorus holiday in 1912 year
(1989); "Чăвашсем вăйă картинче" Чувашский хоровод/Chuvash chorus holiday (1971)
"Маçак каласа панăччĕ" Как рассказывал дед/Grandfather talking (1972)
"Çăлkуç патĕнче" У родника/Spring (hydrosphere) (1985)
"Хальхи юрă" Современная песня/Contemporary song (1996).

Literature
 Трофимов, А. А. В. И. Агеев : Начало творческого пути. Мировоззрение

References

1932 births
Living people
People from Yalchiksky District
Chuvash people
Soviet painters